Vincent Casse (born 21 December 1994) is a Belgian male acrobatic gymnast. Along with his partner, Arne Van Gelder, he finished 4th in the 2014 Acrobatic Gymnastics World Championships.

References

1994 births
Living people
Belgian acrobatic gymnasts
Male acrobatic gymnasts